The 2007–08 Kent State Golden Flashes men's basketball team represented Kent State University in the 2007–08 college basketball season. The team was coached by Jim Christian and played their home games in the Memorial Athletic and Convocation Center. They were members of the Mid-American Conference. They finished the season 28–7, 13–3 in MAC play. The Golden Flashes won the MAC tournament to receive an automatic bid to the NCAA tournament. Kent State lost to UNLV in the opening round.

Roster

Schedule and results
Sources: 

|-
!colspan=9 style=| Non-conference regular season

|-
!colspan=9 style=| MAC regular season

|-
!colspan=9 style=| MAC tournament

|-
!colspan=9 style=| NCAA tournament

Rankings

Awards and honors 
Al Fisher – MAC Player of the Year
Jim Christian – MAC Men's Coach of the Year

References 

Kent State Golden Flashes men's basketball seasons
Kent State Golden Flashes
Kent State
Kent State
Kent State